Justice Waller may refer to:

Benjamin Waller, associate justice of the Supreme court of Virginia
John H. Waller (judge), associate justice of the South Carolina Supreme Court
Bill Waller Jr., chief justice of the Supreme Court of Mississippi